This is a list of notable events in country music that took place in the year 1970.

Events
 April 13 - Marty Robbins is awarded Artist of the Decade for the 1960s by the Academy of Country Music
 September — That Good Ole Nashville Music debuts in syndication. The series will run until 1985.

No Dates
Early in the year, Marty Robbins suffers a major heart attack which almost takes the life of the country star.

Top hits of the year

Number-one hits

United States
(as certified by Billboard)

Notes
1^ No. 1 song of the year, as determined by Billboard.
A^ First Billboard No. 1 hit for that artist.
B^ Last Billboard No. 1 hit for that artist.
C^ Only Billboard No. 1 hit for that artist to date.

Canada
(as certified by RPM)

Notes
2^ Song dropped from No. 1 and later returned to top spot.
A^ First RPM No. 1 hit for that artist.
B^ Last RPM No. 1 hit for that artist.
C^ Only RPM No. 1 hit for that artist.

Other major hits

Singles released by American artists

Singles released by Canadian artists

Top new album releases
{|class="wikitable sortable"
!width="225"|Single
!width="225"|Artist
!width="90"|Record Label
|-
|Charley Pride's 10th Album
|Charley Pride
|RCA
|-
|Christmas in My Home Town
|Charley Pride
|RCA
|-
|Coal Miner's Daughter
|Loretta Lynn
|Decca
|-
|The Fightin' Side of Me
|Merle Haggard
|Capitol
|-
|For the Good Times
|Ray Price
|Columbia
|-
|''Hello Darlin|Conway Twitty
|Decca
|-
|Hello, I'm Johnny Cash
|Johnny Cash
|Columbia
|-
|Just Plain Charley
|Charley Pride
|RCA
|-
|Love Is a Sometimes Thing
|Bill Anderson
|Decca
|-
|Okie From Muskogee
|Merle Haggard
|Capitol
|-
|Tammy's Touch
|Tammy Wynette
|Epic
|-
|The Johnny Cash Show
|Johnny Cash
|Columbia
|-
|The World of Tammy Wynette
|Tammy Wynette
|Epic
|-
|}

Other top albums

Births
 March 14 — Kristian Bush, member of Sugarland
 July 10 — Gary LeVox, lead singer of Rascal Flatts.
 August 22 – George Canyon, country singer from the late 1990s who enjoyed success in the mid 2000s.
 August 24 — Kristyn Osborn, member of SHeDAISY
 August 25 — Jo Dee Messina, female vocalist of the 1990s and 2000s (decade).
 October 5 — Georgette Jones, the only biological child of George Jones and Tammy Wynette.
 October 25 — Chely Wright, country singer of the late 1990s and 2000s (decade).
 November 5 – Heather and Jennifer Kinley, recorded in the late 1990s as the duo The Kinleys
 November 15 — Jack Ingram, rock-styled country singer-songwriter since the mid-2000s (decade).
 December 10 — Kevin Sharp, country singer from the 1990s, best known for "Nobody Knows" (d. 2014)

Deaths
 January 4 – Clayton McMichen, 69, pioneering fiddle player and member of the Skillet Lickers.
 April 1 — Paul Cohen, 61, pioneering record producer at Decca Records.
 September 5 – Curley Williams, 56, songwriter most famous for writing "Half as Much."

Country Music Hall of Fame Inductees
The Original Carter Family – (A. P. Carter 1891–1960, Sara Carter 1898–1979 and Mother Maybelle Carter 1909–1978)

Major awards

Grammy AwardsBest Female Country Vocal Performance — "(I Never Promised You a) Rose Garden", Lynn AndersonBest Male Country Vocal Performance — "For the Good Times", Ray PriceBest Country Performance by a Duo or Group with Vocal — "If I Were a Carpenter", Johnny Cash and June CarterBest Country Instrumental Performance — Me & Jerry, Chet Atkins and Jerry ReedBest Country Song — "My Woman, My Woman, My Wife", Marty Robbins (Performer: Marty Robbins)

Juno AwardsCountry Male Vocalist of the Year — Tommy HunterCountry Female Vocalist of the Year — Dianne LeighCountry Group or Duo of the Year — Mercey Brothers

Academy of Country MusicEntertainer of the Year — Merle HaggardSong of the Year — "For the Good Times", Kris Kristofferson (Performer: Ray Price)Single of the Year — "For the Good Times", Ray PriceAlbum of the Year — For the Good Times, Ray PriceTop Male Vocalist — Merle HaggardTop Female Vocalist — Lynn AndersonTop Vocal Group — The KimberleysTop New Male Vocalist — Buddy AlanTop New Female Vocalist — Sammi Smith

Country Music AssociationEntertainer of the Year — Merle HaggardSong of the Year — "Sunday Mornin' Comin' Down", Kris Kristofferson (Performer: Johnny Cash)Single of the Year — "Okie from Muskogee", Merle HaggardAlbum of the Year — Okie from Muskogee, Merle HaggardMale Vocalist of the Year — Merle HaggardFemale Vocalist of the Year — Tammy WynetteVocal Duo of the Year — Porter Wagoner and Dolly PartonVocal Group of the Year — Tompall and the Glaser BrothersInstrumentalist of the Year — Jerry ReedInstrumental Group of the Year — Danny Davis and the Nashville BrassComedian of the Year''' — Roy Clark

Further reading
Kingsbury, Paul, "The Grand Ole Opry: History of Country Music. 70 Years of the Songs, the Stars and the Stories," Villard Books, Random House; Opryland USA, 1995
Kingsbury, Paul, "Vinyl Hayride: Country Music Album Covers 1947–1989," Country Music Foundation, 2003
Millard, Bob, "Country Music: 70 Years of America's Favorite Music," HarperCollins, New York, 1993
Whitburn, Joel, "Top Country Songs 1944–2005 – 6th Edition." 2005.

Other links
Country Music Association
Inductees of the Country Music Hall of Fame

External links
Country Music Hall of Fame

Country
Country music by year